Blue Rev is the third studio album by Canadian indie pop band Alvvays, released on October 7, 2022, via Polyvinyl, Transgressive, and Celsius Girls. The record sees them mostly departing from the jangle rock and pop prominent on their previous records, in favor of a noisier sound palette, consisting of shoegaze and dream pop influences.

Background
Alvvays' second album, Antisocialites was released in 2017. Afterwards, the band went on an extensive tour across North America and Europe, as well as often supporting the National on their tour dates. They began writing songs for Blue Rev almost immediately after the release of Antisocialites, but several events occurred which delayed the progress of the album: a thief broke into lead singer Molly Rankin's apartment and stole a recorder with several demos contained on it, and the day after, a basement flood threatened to destroy all of the band's gear. The COVID-19 pandemic then created further delays, with border closures preventing the band from rehearsing as a full group. They eventually reconvened in October 2021 in a studio in Los Angeles with producer Shawn Everett; they then went on to play all of Blue Rev front-to-back twice in a single day, with 15-second breaks between songs and a 30-minute break between full album takes.

On June 21, 2022, a month before the announcement of Blue Rev, the band announced a 2022 tour of the US between October and November that year. Blue Rev is named after Rev, a Canadian alcoholic beverage.

Music
"Pharmacist" balances the band's signature indie-pop sound with prominent shoegaze elements, including guitar distortion and "dreamy" vocals by Molly Rankin. Quinn Moreland of Pitchfork compared the song to My Bloody Valentine's Loveless. Other musical influences include Morrissey and the Smiths ("Pressed"), Belinda Carlisle ("Belinda Says"), Teenage Fanclub, and Yo La Tengo. The short story collection After the Quake by Japanese author Haruki Murakami inspired the lyrics of "After the Earthquake".

Promotion
Blue Rev was announced on July 6, 2022, alongside the release of the lead single "Pharmacist". The second single, "Easy On Your Own?", was released on August 10, 2022. "Belinda Says" and "Very Online Guy" were released as a double single on September 22, 2022. The final single, "After the Earthquake", was released on October 5, 2022.

Critical reception

Blue Rev received widespread acclaim from music critics upon its release. At Metacritic, which assigns a normalized rating out of 100 to reviews from professional publications, the album received an average score of 86, based on 15 reviews.

Reviewing the album for AllMusic, Tim Sendra declared that, "the songs are memorable and fun, the performances are inspired, and the production is varied and always interesting," and that "the result is a heavenly indie pop hit guaranteed to make their already besotted fans fall even more head over heels in love with the band." At NME, Will Richards concluded that the album, "stands as an ode to continuing to evolve despite obstacles, slowly honing and tweaking your craft, and keeping on moving." Ben Salmon of Paste wrote, "These are all top-shelf tunes, and they serve as evidence that Rankin and O'Hanley are among the best pop-song writers working today."

Writing for Pitchfork, Jeremey D. Larson claimed, "Alvvays came out with a record that finally is large enough to contain the band's splendor. Every song on Blue Rev is a feast, done up with effortless élan," alongside the publication awarding the album the "Best New Music" tag. Concluding the review for Clash, Bella Savignano called the album, "a magical, twisty excursion to a crossroads where the band simultaneously reflects on yesteryear and explores the turbulence of divergent realities." In Exclaim!, Alex Hudson stated that compared to its namesake, the album "feels less like a hyperactive buzz and more like the crushing hangover the morning after: chaotic, anxiously over-stimulated, and tinged with regretful melancholy."

The album won the Juno Award for Alternative Album of the Year at the Juno Awards of 2023.

Year-end lists

{| class="wikitable sortable plainrowheaders"
|+ Blue Rev on year-end lists
!Publication
!Accolade
!Rank
! class="unsortable" |
|-
!scope="row"|Rolling Stone
|The 100 Best Albums of 2022
|
|
|-
!scope="row"|Exclaim!
|''Exclaim!s 50 Best Albums of 2022
|
|
|-
!scope="row"|The Guardian
|The 50 best albums of 2022
|
|
|-
!scope="row"|The New York Times
|Lindsay Zoladz's Best Albums of 2022
|
|
|-
!scope="row"|NPR
|The 50 Best Albums of 2022
|
|
|-
!scope="row"|Paste
|The 50 Best Albums of 2022
|
|
|-
!scope="row"|Pitchfork
|The 50 Best Albums of 2022
|
|
|-
!scope="row"|Stereogum
|The 50 Best Albums of 2022
|
|
|-
!scope="row"|Uproxx
|The Best Albums of 2022
|N/A
|
|-
!scope="row"|Flood Magazine
|Best Albums of 2022
|
|
|-
!scope="row"|Treble
|The 50 Best Albums of 2022
|
|
|}

Track listing

 On all physical releases of the album, "Fourth Figure" is present but not listed on the tracklist.

PersonnelAlvvays Molly Rankin – vocals, guitar
 Alec O'Hanley – guitar, keyboards, bass
 Kerri MacLellen – keyboards, vocals
 Sheridan Riley – drums
 Abbey Blackwell – bassAdditional musicians Chris Dadge – drums
 Moshe Fisher-Rozenberg – drums
 Drew Jurecka – cello, viola
 Joseph Shabason – flute, baritone saxophone
 Phil Hartunian – guitarTechnical Shawn Everett – production, mixing, engineering
 Molly Rankin – production
 Alec O'Hanley – production, mixing, engineering
 Stephen Koszler – additional engineering
 Phil Hotz – additional engineering
 Robbie Lackritz – additional engineering
 Nyles Spencer – additional engineering
 Julian Decorte – additional engineering
 Amy Fort – additional engineering
 Ivan Wayman – additional engineeringArtwork'''
 Scott Fitzpatrick – design, layout
 Molly Rankin – design, layout
 Alec O'Hanley – design, layout
 Janet Vanzutphen – photograph
 Nora MacLeod – additional work
 Kerri MacLellen – additional work

Charts

References

2022 albums
Alvvays albums
Polyvinyl Record Co. albums
Transgressive Records albums
Albums produced by Shawn Everett
Juno Award for Alternative Album of the Year albums